The Greater Manchester Police and Crime Commissioner was the police and crime commissioner, an elected official tasked with setting out the way crime is tackled by the Greater Manchester Police in Greater Manchester between 2012 and 2017.  The post was created on 21 November 2012, following an election held on 15 November 2012, and replaced the Greater Manchester Police Authority. Upon the creation of a Mayor of Greater Manchester and the inaugural election to that position, the duties of Greater Manchester Police and Crime Commissioner were subsumed into the mayoralty and the office itself abolished. For the entirety of its existence, the commissioner was Labour Party politician Tony Lloyd. The police and crime commissioner was required to produce a strategic Greater Manchester Police and Crime Plan, setting out the priorities for the Greater Manchester Police, and their work is scrutinised by the Greater Manchester Police and Crime Panel. In November 2014 it was announced that the role would be replaced with a directly elected Mayor of Greater Manchester, and the term of office of the incumbent commissioner was extended to May 2017.

Dale Cregan escorts
Tony Lloyd criticised the Home Secretary Theresa May for allowing the daily prison escorts of Dale Cregan from Strangeways Prison to Preston Crown Court. He claimed the operation put officers at risk and was unnecessary. Escorting Cregan and his co-accused cost over £5 million. Lloyd Said “So it appears that common sense can be scattered to the wind if you don’t have to pick up the tab. In the end, of course, we’ve all had to pay for this operation because, although the Home Office have agreed to cover some of the costs, the taxpayer is still significantly out of pocket at a time when finances across the public sector are stretched so much.”

Firearms licences
In 2013 Lloyd backed calls to increase the fee for a firearms certificate because of the shortfall in costs for Greater Manchester Police to carry out background checks.

Elections

2012

Footnotes 

Police and crime commissioners of Greater Manchester
Greater Manchester Police
Police and crime commissioners in England